Jason Watson may refer to:

Jason Watson (footballer) (born 1991), Jamaican footballer
Jason Watson (jockey) (born 2000), English jockey